Williamsville Athletic Club, abbreviated as WAC, is an Ivorian football club based in Abidjan.

It was announced in December 2017 that Ivorian footballer Didier Drogba had joined the club as a board member.

Honours
Côte d'Ivoire Premier Division: 0
Runners-up: 2017

Performance in CAF competitions
CAF Champions League: 1 appearance
2018 –

Current squad

Former managers
 Kjetil Zachariassen (2018-2018)
 Rachid Ghaflaoui (2019-2019)

References

External links
Facebook page

Football clubs in Ivory Coast
Football clubs in Abidjan